Rheinmetall LTA2 is a 105 mm tank gun produced by the Rheinmetall firm of Germany.

See also
 List of artillery
 Germany

105 mm artillery
Tank guns of Germany
Cold War artillery of Germany
LTA2